Exchange Irrigation Scheme is a 165 hectare irrigated arable land in Zhombe Communal Land but in Silobela Constituency in Kwekwe District of the Midlands Province of Zimbabwe. It is 37 km southwest of Zhombe Joel, 83 km northwest of Kwekwe and 25 km north of Crossroads DSC.

It is in region 3; the climatic conditions are semi arid with an average rainfall of 632mm per annum. Estimated elevation is 1200 metres above sea level.

Background

Exchange Irrigation Scheme developed in two phases. The first phase was when in 1973 56 hectares were developed to supplement to farmers who had been resettled on 2.5 hectare dry land per household.
Plot holder then had a "comma" as it is popularly known; thus a 0,1 hectare (if a person has 0,2ha he is said to have 2 commas. 1 hectare is 10 commas: ,1x10)

Phase 2 was when the scheme was rehabilitated and developed to 165 hectare; that is +109 hectares. The second phase saw allocation of commas to new farmer and addition of commas to existing farmers. In 1997 there were 850 plot holders with an average of 0.2ha plots per farmer.

Water Source

It is fed by Exchange Dam which is on Gweru River. Gweru River is a tributary of Shangani River. Exchange Dam is the biggest reservoir in Gweru River followed by Insukamini Dam in Lower Gweru.

Exchange Dam, sometimes called Exchange Block Dam was built in 1972 primarily for irrigation. Its full capacity is 9 million cubic litres.

Objectives

Primary objectives of the irrigation scheme was to equip farmers with a basic source of income materially and cash. Farmers could earn at least a sum equivalent to the government gazetted minimum wage by selling sweet green grocery produced from the irrigated land.

Beneficiaries

About 900 farmers and their families who live near Exchange Irrigation Scheme are the primary beneficiaries of the scheme.

Most of the surrounding farmers have dry land rain-fed fields averaging 2.5 hectares. Livestock of these farmer also benefit by foraging at the adjacent bush that is evergreen watered by spillage irrigation water.

Management

The scheme was developed by Agritex, an extensition-work department of the Ministry of Agriculture.

It is managed by the scheme management committee elected by participating farmers from among their members.

Maintenance is carried out by civil servants at the scheme in unison with the management committee, Agritex officers and plot holders.

Women

Women have 50% representation in the management committee yet the percentage of work by women is only 
33. However 80% of workers in the irrigation scheme are women.

Irrigation

Irrigation is water is
dam pumped from Exchange Block Dam into a night storage reservoir before being canal distributed into two other reservoirs further into the scheme for surface flooding of plots. Unlike Ngondoma Irrigation Scheme on the other side of Zhombe, this scheme water is driven by electric pumps.

The plots are 0.1ha each and are arranged in blocks of 20ha to 30ha each. There are 6 blocks in total covering all the 165 active arable hectares.

The tertiary offtake gates are operated by hand by either the civil servants or members of the management committee. Water is shared evenly at one day per week for each block of the six blocks.

The seventh day, Sunday, is reserved for night storage top-ups and for watering nursery beds in any block.

Irrigation Seasons

July–February is maize corn season.

March–June is the Beans and Tomato season.

Yields

Normally yields are 7000 kg corn (sold as green maize) per hectare and more than 1000 kg/ha for beans.
At the market prices of $0.43/kg for green maize and $1.50/kg for beans, the two crops have a value of $3000/ha for maize and $1500/ha for beans, giving a combined harvest value of $4500/ha per year.

The values quoted above are based on the following;
700 kg per comma (per 0,1ha). Green maize is usually sold in dozens and a dozen has an average of 7 kg. With this assumption 1 comma would sell for US$300 at US$3 per dozen.

1000 kg/ha to 1200 kg/ha beans. That is 100 kg to 120 kg per comma of beans. Beans usually sell at US$1.50 per kg. (US$30/20 kg bucket).

See also

 Ngondoma Irrigation Scheme 
 Senkwasi Irrigation Scheme 
 Zhombe 
 Silobela 
 Zibagwe RDC

References

Agriculture in Zimbabwe
Rural community development